Peter Salzberg is an American former college basketball coach and was the head men's basketball coach at Vermont from 1972 to 1981.

Coaching career
After a playing both basketball and golf at Columbia, Salzberg worked for the Associated Press for two years before being hired as the Columbia freshman basketball team coach by Jack Rohan in 1967. Salzberg would also serve as the university's golf coach and assistant to the director of athletics during his tenure at his alma mater.

In 1972, Salzberg was hired as the head men's basketball coach at Vermont, where he would coach for eight years, ending with an overall record of 102-131, and ranks fifth all time at Vermont in wins. Salzberg resigned from the position after nine seasons, and was replaced by his assistant, Bill Whitmore.

Head coaching record

College

References

American men's basketball coaches
American men's basketball players
College men's basketball head coaches in the United States
Columbia Lions men's golfers
Columbia Lions men's basketball players
Vermont Catamounts men's basketball coaches
Place of birth missing (living people)